New Year's Evil may refer to:

 New Year's Evil (film), a 1980 film
 New Year's Evil (comics),  Fifth-week event published by DC Comics
 New Year's Evil (Nancy Drew/Hardy Boys), a Supermystery novel
 New Year's Evil, a special episode of WCW Monday Nitro, December 27, 1999
 NXT: New Year's Evil, a special episode of WWE NXT, January 6, 2021